Zoo Tycoon is a series of business simulation video games. The worlds focus around building and running successful zoo scenarios. The series was initially developed by Blue Fang Games and published by Microsoft Studios who later in 2001–2008 went on to create two stand-alone video games and seven expansion packs for PC and Macintosh platforms. In 2013, Microsoft Studios released a new Zoo Tycoon game, developed by Frontier Developments for Xbox One and Xbox 360. An enhanced version of the Xbox game, Zoo Tycoon: Ultimate Animal Collection, was released for Windows 10 and the Xbox One on October 31, 2017.
Frontier Developments, the developer of the final Zoo Tycoon game, released the spiritual successor to the series, Planet Zoo, in 2019.

Gameplay 
Zoo Tycoon is a zoo simulation video game putting the player in control of their own fictional zoo business. The gameplay formula introduced in the original Zoo Tycoon in 2001 received updates throughout the series, but its theme and main motifs remain unchanged: Players must build, expand, and/or upgrade a zoo by purchasing animals, creating suitable animal habitats, and allocate staff and resources for animal maintenance and care. As the ultimate goal of the game is revenue, players must also provide for visitors by building food/drink stands, sanitary facilities, picnic areas, and an aesthetically pleasing environment. Higher revenue is generated by keeping both animals and visitors happy. If the animals are released from their enclosure, they can kill the visitors.

Zoo Tycoon features four modes: Training, Scenario, Challenge, and Freestyle. The Scenario mode puts players in control of a preset scenario in which they have to accomplish multiple objectives within a time period. New items are unlocked as the scenario progresses. The Challenge mode, first introduced in Zoo Tycoon 2, resembles the Scenario mode in that the player is in a preset scenario with limited funds and must accomplish certain goals. It differs in that this mode is not progressive. The Freestyle mode differs in each game, but usually leaves the player free to build a zoo from scratch however they see fit.

Games

Zoo Tycoon (2001)

Zoo Tycoon, released in 2001, was followed in 2002 by two expansion packs: Dinosaur Digs and Marine Mania. Within a year, Zoo Tycoon had sold over 1 million units, reaching the top-selling status on the software charts. Also, a free Endangered Species download was available from Microsoft.com. In 2003, Zoo Tycoon: Complete Collection was released which included everything: the original game, the expansion packs, and the downloadable content.

Zoo Tycoon 2 (2004)

Zoo Tycoon 2 was released in 2004 and was followed by the first expansion pack, Endangered Species, in 2005. The African Adventure and Marine Mania were released the following year. Also available as a premium download was the Dino Danger Pack, available for purchase by credit card from the Zoo Tycoon website. Finally, Extinct Animals was released in 2007.

Zookeeper Collection was a compilation of the original game, the Endangered Species, and the African Adventure expansions. Ultimate Collection was a compilation of the original game and all of its expansions.

Zoo Tycoon (2013)

Microsoft released a Zoo Tycoon game for Xbox One and Xbox 360 in 2013 as an Xbox One Launch Title.

Microsoft announced a remaster of the 2013 game, Zoo Tycoon: Ultimate Animal Collection, for Windows 10 and the Xbox One on August 20, 2017. It features 4K resolution, HDR and 60 FPS support on Xbox One X. In addition to improved graphics and gameplay, new animals such as kangaroos, koalas, and cougars were included. It was released on October 31, 2017. There are multiple campaigns and challenges with animals from across the globe.

Handheld and mobile editions
In addition to the main series, there are several handheld and mobile games. Zoo Tycoon DS (2005) and Zoo Tycoon 2 DS (2008). Zoo Tycoon 2 and its expansion Marine Mania are both available for the mobile phone. With the exception of Zoo Tycoon 2 DS, none of these games were developed by Blue Fang Games. Zoo Tycoon: Friends was a free-to-play title developed by Behaviour Interactive, released in 2014. In April 2015, Microsoft permanently shut down Zoo Tycoon: Friends servers due to technical problems.

Board game
Zoo Tycoon: The Board Game is currently in development to be released in 2023.

See also
 Zoo Empire
 Wildlife Park
 Planet Zoo

References

External links
Official website

 
Blue Fang Games games
Microsoft franchises
Video game franchises
Video game franchises introduced in 2001
Video games about animals
Video games set in zoos